"Sugartime" is a popular song written by Charlie Phillips and Odis Echols, and published in 1957. The biggest hit version was by the McGuire Sisters, whose recording of it topped the Most Played  chart in February 1958.  It was also the second number 1 Billboard single for the trio after 1954's "Sincerely". The song refers to the Jimmie Rodgers tune "Honeycomb", which had been recorded a few months earlier in 1957.

A version by Johnny Cash, culled from his Sun Records catalogue, briefly returned to the Cashbox country chart in 1961. 

The chorus was sampled for the title song of the Bollywood movie Dil Deke Dekho.

The melody is remarkably similar to that of "I'm Daffy Over You", written by Chico Marx and Sol Violinsky, and performed by Marx in several films.

The main melody is also reminiscent of Saint-Saens' Havanaise.

Cover versions 
A recording by  British singer Alma Cogan was a hit later in 1958.
The McGuire Sisters themselves covered it in a twist arrangement in 1960. It was their last chart hit as a trio, bubbling under the Billboard Hot 100 at number 107.
Alice Babs (Swedish lyrics by Eric Sandström)
Lily Berglund, another Swedish version
Linda McCartney
Johnny Cash (on Now Here's Johnny Cash)
Shigga Shay sampled it in "Shigga Morning", featuring Inch Chua.
Bagel Bites co-opted the song for a jingle in a 1996 commercial titled "Pizza in the Morning".
The Wilburn Brothers on the album Side by Side (Decca, 1958)

References

External links
 

1957 singles
1957 songs
The McGuire Sisters songs
Johnny Cash songs
Coral Records singles
Sun Records singles